Minami (kanji 南,  hiragana みなみ) is a Japanese word meaning "south".

Places

Japan 
There are several Minami wards in Japan, most of them appropriately in the south part of a city:
Minami, Tokushima, a village in Tokushima Prefecture
Minami-ku, Sapporo
Minami-ku, Niigata
Minami-ku, Saitama
Minami-ku, Yokohama
Minami-ku, Sagamihara
Minami-ku, Hamamatsu
Minami-ku, Nagoya
Minami-ku, Kyoto
Minami-ku, Sakai
Minami-ku, Okayama
Minami-ku, Hiroshima
Minami-ku, Fukuoka
Minami ward of Osaka merged with Higashi ward and is now part of Chūō ward.

Other uses 
 Minami (name)

See also 
Other directions:
Nishi (West)
Higashi (disambiguation) (East)
Kita (disambiguation) (North)